Mirani (also Romanized as Mīranī; also known as Mārānī) is a village in Sardabeh Rural District, in the Central District of Ardabil County, Ardabil Province, Iran. At the 2006 census, its population was 129, in 30 families.

References 

Towns and villages in Ardabil County